Fontevraud-l'Abbaye is a commune in the western French department of Maine-et-Loire. It is situated both in the Loire Valley, a UNESCO World Heritage Site between Chalonnes-sur-Loire and Sully-sur-Loire, and the Loire Anjou Touraine French regional natural park.

Population (1999): 1,189
Area: 1,482 ha
Average altitude: 80 m

Notable buildings
 The royal abbey of Fontevraud
 Saint Catherine's chapel with its lantern of the dead
 Chapelle Notre-Dame-de-Pitié (chapel of Our Lady of Compassion)
 Église Saint-Michel (church of St Michael)

See also
Communes of the Maine-et-Loire department

References

External links

Chateau de Montreuil-Bellay

Fontevraudlabbaye
Maine-et-Loire communes articles needing translation from French Wikipedia